Orocrambus cultus is a moth in the family Crambidae. It was first described by Alfred Philpott in 1917 from specimens collected by Merlin Owen Pasco. It is endemic to New Zealand, where it is known from Cecil Peak.

The wingspan is about 20 mm. The forewings are deep yellowish brown with dusky black markings on the costa and dorsum. Adults have been recorded on wing in January.

References

Crambinae
Moths described in 1917
Endemic fauna of New Zealand
Moths of New Zealand
Endemic moths of New Zealand